Made In the A.M. is the fifth studio album by English-Irish boy band One Direction, released on 13 November 2015, by Columbia Records and Syco Music. This album is also the group's first album following the departure of Zayn Malik, who left the group on March 25, 2015, and the group's last album before they entered their indefinite hiatus in January 2016. The album was preceded by the three singles "Drag Me Down", released on 31 July 2015; "Perfect", released on 16 October 2015 and "History", released on 6 November 2015. These three singles reached the top 10 in a number of national charts. 
 
Upon its release, the record received generally favourable reviews from critics. It debuted at number one on the UK Albums Chart with 93,189 copies, and it debuted at number two on the US Billboard 200, with 459,000 album-equivalent units in it first-week which of 402,000 copies were pure album sales, behind Justin Bieber's Purpose. The album's first-week sales were higher than the band's previous album, Four, which amassed an opening sale of 387,000 in 2014, breaking a predicted boy band trend of consecutive declining album sales. Additionally, Made in the A.M. was the second fastest-selling album of 2015 in the UK, surpassed only by Adele's 25, a week after the album's release. According to the International Federation of the Phonographic Industry, Made in the A.M. was the sixth best-selling album of 2015 with 2.4 million copies sold worldwide.

Background
The album was announced on 22 September 2015. Following the release of its lead single, "Drag Me Down", it was revealed that the group would go on a temporary hiatus in 2016 to take a break. On 22 September, the title for the fifth studio album, Made in the A.M., was officially announced along with promotional single "Infinity" being released. The group began to reveal the track listing on their Snapchat stories to which it was later confirmed on iTunes. The band members all agreed that this album was the best work out of their other efforts due to their main involvement with writing and composition for the majority of the songs.

Julian Bunetta, the producer behind many of the group's songs, told Billboard that the fifth album was recorded with the four members knowing it would be their last for a while. "There was a feeling of, 'Well, we’re going to take a break, and anything in the world can happen during that time off'", adding, "There's a song about losing someone that isn't Zayn. There's also a song about the band being on shaky ground and not knowing what the future is. There are songs about love, there's a song that is a little more sexually charged. It's all over the map."

Singles 
"Drag Me Down" was spontaneously released as the album's lead single on 31 July 2015, with no previous promotion or warning. It debuted at number one on the UK Singles Chart, breaking the record for the most streamed song in its first week, with 2.03 million plays. In the United States, the song debuted at number three on the Billboard Hot 100 chart, with 350,000 downloads in its first week, earning the band their largest sales week ever. "Drag Me Down" also broke and set a new Vevo record by having the fastest and most likes earned in 24 hours. "Perfect" was serviced as the album's second single on 16 October 2015. The song debuted at number two in the UK and number ten on the Billboard Hot 100 chart. The debut gave the band their fifth top 10 start on the Hot 100, passing the record among groups of four debuts, previously held by The Beatles.

"Infinity" was issued as a promotional single on the iTunes Store and Apple Music on 22 September 2015. "What a Feeling" was released as the second promotional single, two days prior the album's release date.

Although "Infinity" was announced as the album's third single by member Liam Payne, "History" was later confirmed as the next single. On 27 January 2016, the official music video for "History" was released to the One Direction Vevo channel and YouTube. It peaked at number six on the UK Official Chart in 2016.

Critical reception

Made in the A.M. has received generally favourable reviews from music critics. At Metacritic, which assigns a weighted average rating out of 100 from selected independent ratings and reviews from mainstream critics, the album received a Metascore of 65, based on 11 reviews, indicating "generally favourable reviews".

Neil McCormick of The Daily Telegraph wrote that "a slight tone of weariness may have crept into 1D's lyrics with songs about break-ups and yearning for home but musically it remains anthemic, up-tempo, superior pop, with elegant song structure, ear worm hooks and radio busting choruses". Although Kenneth Partridge of Billboard magazine declared that the album "could be the band's Abbey Road" and awarded it four stars, he also critiqued the group as a "prefab 21st-century pop machine" who churns out "boilerplate love songs that rarely feel personal or look beyond" their "vacuum-sealed bubble-gum world". Writing for Rolling Stone, Rob Sheffield stated that the album is "1D's Let It Be – the kind of record the world's biggest pop group makes when it's time to say thanks for the memories." Regarding the album's sound, he noted it is "chasing the rock vibe of Midnight Memories and Four". Leah Greenblatt of Entertainment Weekly complimented the album for being "another deft collection of shiny, hermetically sealed anthems".

Shira Benozilio of Hollywood Life called it "their most diverse album yet" while specifically highlighting the album opener, "Hey Angel", praising the "catchy, upbeat sound that is sure to put anyone in a good mood" while commenting that it had "an Oasis vibe". Patrick Ryan of USA Today commented that the group's "writing is sharper and their sound richer than before" and that "if Made in the A.M. ends up being One Direction's final album, it's not a bad swansong to go out on". Patrick Ryan, writing for Idolator, wrote that "it's an album that sounds like another day at the office for the group's remaining members, replete with ballads, soaring pop styles, an a cappella vocal group experiment, the aforementioned intense, late night “dark track” and that "the lads are as sincere and focused as ever, without any overt acknowledgement that this is the end of an era" while comparing songs on the album to the likes of Coldplay and Paul McCartney and Wings.

Tshepo Mokoena of The Guardian commented that the album is "a playful but reflective goodbye" and "just what their mourning fans need". Writing for SPIN, Alfred Soto wrote that the album includes more "sensitivity" than previous efforts while adding that the record offers "hits plus filler". Tim Sendra of AllMusic commented that the album "another slice of high-quality modern pop brought to life by the band's charm" and that "the album's mix of upbeat dance-pop songs, emotional midtempo songs, and big, gut-wrenching ballads is a familiar one". He added that the "other bandmembers pick up the slack [of Malik's absence] impressively" and that "their songwriting shows growth, their vocals remain flawless, the production team continues to throw the occasional curveball to go along with the softballs, and there are plenty of songs that sound like the best pop music has to offer in 2015". Annie Zaleski of The A.V. Club commented that the album "proudly (and prominently) feels indebted to other eras and totems of U.K. pop" while adding that the album "strives for timelessness" and that "even if the band members don't return from their break, they can rest easy: they've gone out on a high note, because Made in the A.M. is One Direction's best, most accomplished album". Lewis Corner, writing for Digital Spy wrote that the album "proves they have continued to push their style in unexpected ways", that it "rounds off a phenomenal chapter in their career, bringing together the pop, rock and folky influences that helped them go from teenage upstarts to a billion dollar industry", and that "for a group limited by the perception that they are just "boyband pop", their music has become as accomplished as their shining achievements".

Jon Caramanica of the New York Times had a more negative review, commenting that "the music is too banal to support exceptional singing" and that the album was "rootless and vague". He compared sounds of the album to the likes of Coldplay, Huey Lewis and the News, and The Bee Gees. Leah Greenblatt, writing with Entertainment Weekly commented that "the lyrics, with a few subtly naughty exceptions, are still largely crafted for listeners whose idea of romance is a Disney prince—dashing, devoted, and safely two-dimensional" and that "One Direction don't seem ready yet to explore their own more adult voices. Or maybe they're just saving it for their solo records". Kate Solomon of Drowned In Sound praised "Olivia", stating that it is the only song on the album "that sounds even vaguely like anyone is having any fun" while ending the review with "it's not that this album is particularly bad, it's that I don't understand why it isn't better".

Commercial performance
In the UK, Made in the A.M. debuted at number one on the UK Albums Chart with first-week sales of 93,189, becoming their fourth album to top the chart and the fastest selling album of 2015 until that point, beating out Justin Bieber's album Purpose. The album was certified Silver by the British Phonographic Industry (BPI) in its first week, and certified Platinum on 1 January 2016, denoting shipments of 300,000 copies. The album debuted at number two on the Billboard 200 with 459,000 album-equivalent units (402,000 pure album sales), behind Justin Bieber's Purpose, becoming the band's first album to not debut at number one. , the album has sold a total of 1,000,000 copies in the United States, counting pure sales and streams.

Track listing

Notes
 signifies a vocal producer
 signifies an additional producer

Personnel
(Credits taken from Made in the A.M. liner notes.)

All tracks mastered by Tom Coyne at Sterling Sound, NY
Queen of vocals – Helene Horlyck
Art director – Kate Moross
Photographer – Sven Jacobsen
Design – Studio Moross

Charts

Weekly charts

Monthly charts

Year-end charts

Certifications

Release history

References

One Direction albums
Columbia Records albums
2015 albums
Syco Music albums
Albums produced by TMS (production team)
Albums produced by Johan Carlsson